Full boat may refer to:
 Full house (poker), a type of poker hand
 A variation of Navasana, a yoga asana